Doug Daigneault was a Canadian Football League player whose main position was defensive back. He played for three teams from 1960 to 1965 and was part of the Ottawa Rough Riders' 48th Grey Cup-winning team in 1960.

Doug Daigneault was born in Valleyfield, Quebec. After playing college football at Clemson University and participating in three major bowl games, Daigneault joined the Ottawa Rough Riders in 1960, the year they won the 48th Grey Cup, until 1963, while playing both offensive and defensive back, mostly the latter. In 1961, he intercepted 5 passes, his highest total ever. He also rushed for the only touchdown of his career. Injuries limited Daigneault to only six games in 1962 and he played four games for Ottawa in 1963 before being traded to the Winnipeg Blue Bombers, where he finished the season with 1 interception. In 1964, Daigneault was traded back east to the Montreal Alouettes, where he remained until 1965, playing in all 14 games during both seasons before retiring.

After his CFL career, Daigneault became basketball coach from 1966 to 1989 and assistant athletic director at Loyola College (later Concordia University).  Daigneault won the coach of the year award in the Quebec conference during the 1984–85 season.  He was also active in the Montreal Alouette Alumni Association.

References

1936 births
Canadian football defensive backs
Living people
Clemson Tigers football players
Montreal Alouettes players
Winnipeg Blue Bombers players
Ottawa Rough Riders players
Sportspeople from Salaberry-de-Valleyfield
Players of Canadian football from Quebec